Sarcodontia sibirica is a species of toothed crust fungus in the family Meruliaceae. It was originally described by Czech mycologist Albert Pilát in 1936 as Acia sibirica. T.L. Nikolajeva transferred it to the genus Sarcodontia in 1961.

References

Fungi described in 1936
Fungi of Europe
Meruliaceae